Ulidiotites dakotana is a species of ulidiid or picture-winged fly in the genus Ulidiotites of the family Ulidiidae.

Distribution
United States.

References

Ulidiidae
Taxa named by George C. Steyskal
Diptera of North America
Insects described in 1961